Brilliant is a town in Marion County, Alabama, United States. At the 2020 census the population was 845.

History
In the late part of the 19th century, the discovery of coal led to the development of the Aldridge Mining Company in 1897 (later, in 1906, named the Brilliant Coal Company), which was located adjacent to the town. The Brilliant Coal Company served as a catalyst for growth for the area and provided ample employment for more than 50 years.

The towns of Brilliant and Boston were so closely associated that no attempt was made to separate their history. Eventually, in 1957, with the passage of Act 284 by the Alabama Legislature, Boston was incorporated into the town of Brilliant, and the name "Boston" was dropped. Boston had originally taken its name in honor of Jimmy L. Bostick, one of the first settlers of the town. The name "Brilliant" is derived from the glossy sheen found on the type of high-grade coal that was mined near the town, before the demise of the Brilliant Coal Company in 1953. The coal was said to burn so brilliantly, due to its composition of only 2 ash, 1 sulfur and no clinker.  

At the turn of the 20th century, the Brilliant and Boston area was the most densely populated part of Marion County.

By the end of the 1950s the Brilliant Coal Company had shuttered its mining operations; however, several smaller mining operations were in business around the area until the early 1990s.

From 1987 until 2000 the town was home to Brilliant Homes Ltd., a manufacturer of mobile homes. The company was acquired by American Homestar Corporation of League City, Texas, in 1997. The plant was closed on April 15, 2000, due to declining sales throughout the manufactured housing industry. American Homestar Corporation subsequently filed for Chapter 11 bankruptcy later in 2001.

Employers in the town include a garment manufacturing plant, Tullahoma Industries, which produces garments for the U.S. Army, and Stone Canyon Cabins, which manufactures park model cabins at the site of the old Brilliant Homes plant.

The following is from a August 30, 1957, Winfield Journal article:
Boston is Now Brilliant; Act Also Extends Corporate Limits

Geography
Brilliant is located in southeastern Marion County at  (34.022764, -87.767372). It is bordered to the south by the city of Winfield and to the west by Guin. Interstate 22 passes through the southern part of the town, with access from Exit 30 (State Route 129) and Exit 26 (State Route 44).

The town is drained by Bostick Creek and Little Clifty Creek, southeast-flowing tributaries of the Little New River, one of the headwaters of the Sipsey River and part of the Tombigbee River watershed.

Demographics

As of the census of 2000, there were 762 people, 343 households, and 220 families residing in the town. The racial makeup of the town was 99.61% White, 0.13% Native American, and 0.26% from two or more races. 0.66% of the population were Hispanic or Latino of any race.

There were 343 households, out of which 27.7% had children under the age of 18 living with them, 48.7% were married couples living together, 12.2% had a female householder with no husband present, and 35.6% were non-families. 34.1% of all households were made up of individuals, and 16.0% had someone living alone who was 65 years of age or older. The average household size was 2.22 and the average family size was 2.81.

In the town, the population was spread out, with 22.7% under the age of 18, 7.2% from 18 to 24, 25.1% from 25 to 44, 25.5% from 45 to 64, and 19.6% who were 65 years of age or older. The median age was 41 years. For every 100 females, there were 91.5 males. For every 100 females age 18 and over, there were 85.8 males.

The median income for a household in the town was $18,224, and the median income for a family was $27,857. Males had a median income of $28,611 versus $15,703 for females. The per capita income for the town was $14,516. About 22.4% of families and 26.5% of the population were below the poverty line, including 37.3% of those under age 18 and 27.0% of those age 65 or over.

Transportation

Major highways

 Interstate 22
 State Route 44
 State Route 129

References

External links
 

Towns in Marion County, Alabama
Towns in Alabama
Populated places established in 1957